Richard Morley Tettelbach (June 26, 1929 – January 26, 1995) nicknamed "Tut", was a Major League Baseball outfielder. He attended college at Yale University, playing alongside future President George H. W. Bush in one season. Tettelbach played 29 games with the New York Yankees and Washington Senators with 12 hits in 80 at bats.

External links

1929 births
1995 deaths
New York Yankees players
Washington Senators (1901–1960) players
Baseball players from New Haven, Connecticut
Major League Baseball outfielders
Yale Bulldogs baseball players
Joplin Miners players
Norfolk Tars players
Binghamton Triplets players
Birmingham Barons players
Denver Bears players